Nightingale: A New Musical is a musical (described by the composer as a children's opera) in one act, with book, music and lyrics by Charles Strouse. It is based on Hans Christian Andersen's 1843 fairy tale, "The Nightingale", and tells the story of a Chinese emperor who learns, nearly too late, that wealth cannot buy happiness.

The work premiered at the Buxton Festival and then in London at the Lyric Hammersmith beginning on December 18, 1982, with a cast including Sarah Brightman as the title character, Nightingale. In the U.S. a fully staged production of the show was given by the First All Children's Theatre in New York in May 1982 with sets by Oliver Smith, costumes by Christine Andrews, and lighting by Victor En Yu Tan The group then gave a preview of the work in New York in March 1983 before the North American premiere at "The Barns" at Wolf Trap, Virginia, in April 1983. Since then, the show has been performed numerous times throughout the world.

A cast album was released in 1985 with the London cast.

Musical numbers
Prologue – Orchestra 
Perfect Harmony – Company 
Why Am I So Happy? – The Maid 
Take Us To the Forest – Company 
Who Are These People – Nightingale 
Never Speak Directly to an Emperor – Palace Guards 
Nightingale – Company 
The Emperor is a Man – The Maid 
I Was Lost – Emperor / Nightingale 
Charming – Two Peacocks 
A Singer Must Be Free – Nightingale 
The Mechanical Bird – The Company / Mechanical Bird 
Please Don't Make Me Hear That Song Again – Company / Mechanical Bird 
Rivers Cannot Flow Upwards – The Maid, Nightingale 
Death Duet – Death, Emperor, Maid and Nightingale 
We Are China – Company

Synopsis
The Emperor of China is powerful and wealthy, but isolated from the world around him.  He hears that the most beautiful thing in his country is the song of the nightingale (though a dull-looking bird), and he has a beautiful maid bring the bird to him.  The nightingale becomes popular, and when the Emperor almost dies, the nightingale's song brings him back to life.  Soon, the nightingale and the Emperor become good friends, but the nightingale is unhappy at her captivity.  Meanwhile, the Emperor is sent a gift of a mechanical bird that can sing and is covered in beautiful jewels.  The new toy becomes the star at the palace, and everyone forgets about the nightingale.  The neglected nightingale flies away, and no one notices.

Finally, when the mechanical bird breaks down, the Emperor notices that the nightingale has flown away.  He realizes that he made a mistake: you cannot possess what you love.  Burying himself in work, the lonely Emperor grows ill.  Meanwhile, the beautiful palace maid has fallen in love with the Emperor.  The Emperor nearly dies again, but the nightingale returns, and her song is again victorious over Death.  The Emperor asks the nightingale to teach him the song of life, the greatest gift in the world.  The bird replies that the palace maid has already given him the greatest gift: her innocent love.  The nightingale then teaches them the song, and the Emperor, the maid and the nightingale all live happily ever after.

Act 1

In China, an Emperor is told of "the Nightingale", a bird that is so beautiful it makes even the fisherman stop just to hear her song ("How Beautiful!"). The Emperor tells his Courtiers to find the Nightingale within the day, the Courtiers ask the non-royal Courtiers to find the Nightingale ("Have You Seen The Nightingale?"). The Chef finds a Little Girl (that is unnamed) that knows the Nightingale. The Courtiers tell the Emperor, and the Emperor makes it the Little Girl's mission to find the Nightingale and bring it to him. The Little Girl takes the Courtiers to the forest ("Follow Me"). The Courtiers mock the Nightingale upon seeing it, but when they hear her song, they bring her to the Emperor ("Nightingale?"). The Citizens of China hear the Nightingale and they make it a nation treasure ("Festival Medley").

Act 2

The Narrators tell the audience how things have been throughout the last few years ("Entr'acte" / Beautiful Underscore"). The Emperor gets a present from Japan that is a Mechanical Bird. The Courtiers prefer The Mechanical Bird over the real one, and the Little Girl lets it escape. The Emperor banishes the bird, and the Mechanical Bird replaces the real one ("The Mechanical Bird"). The Emperor gets ill because the Mechanical Bird breaks down, and is only able to sing every year, and the Emperor is close to dying, when the Little Girl gifts the Emperor something ("Elegy"). The Emperor opens the gift, and the gift is the real Nightingale! The Nightingale's song helps the Emperor live ("Finale"). The Citizens celebrate the Nightingale ("How Beautiful (Reprise)").

Roles and London cast
Narrator (baritone) – Andrew Shore
Emperor (bass-baritone) – Gordon Sandison
Nightingale (soprano) – Sarah Brightman
Maid (soprano or mezzo-soprano) – Susannah Fellows
Peacock #1 – Dinah Harris
Peacock #2 (mezzo-soprano) – Jill Pert
Death – Michael Heath
Mechanical Bird – Carole Brooke
Minister, Sculptor, Banker, animals, etc.

Notes

External links
Review of a 1984 New York production
Nightingale at Guide to Musical Theatre
Site with extensive information about Strouse and his works

1982 musicals
West End musicals
Musicals based on works by Hans Christian Andersen
Musicals by Charles Strouse
Music about nightingales
Works based on The Nightingale (fairy tale)